Dorothy Ayer Gardner King Ford (February 27, 1892 – September 17, 1967) was the mother of U.S. President Gerald Ford.

Early life and marriage

Dorothy Ayer Gardner was born in the small town of Harvard, Illinois to Levi Addison Gardner, a businessman and one-time mayor, and Adele Augusta (Ayer) Gardner.

There she married her first husband, wool trader Leslie Lynch King of Omaha, Nebraska, on September 7, 1912. She met him while she was in college, as he was the charming brother of her roommate.

The couple returned to Omaha, King's home. They lived at first with his parents at their  Victorian mansion at 3202 Woolworth Avenue. His parents were wealthy banker and businessman Charles Henry King and the former Martha Alicia Porter, both from Fayette County, Pennsylvania.

Dorothy and Leslie King's son was born on July 14, 1913. They named him Leslie Lynch King Jr. Soon after her marriage, Dorothy discovered that her husband was abusive. In Omaha she further discovered he was a liar and alcoholic, but she was soon pregnant. With the support of his parents, she stayed with them and her husband until the birth of their son. After Leslie threatened her and the child with a butcher knife a few days after the birth, Gardner King completed her plans to leave her husband.

Separation and divorce
Sixteen days after the birth of her son, Dorothy Gardner King left her husband. Divorce was unusual then, but she refused to continue to risk her son's safety or her own. She took Leslie Jr. with her to the Oak Park, Illinois home of her sister Tannisse and her husband, Clarence Haskins James. From there she moved to the home of her parents, who had relocated to Grand Rapids, Michigan. That was where her son grew up.

Dorothy Gardner King quickly filed for formal separation and divorce. On December 19, 1913, an Omaha court granted a divorce to the Kings. Leslie King refused to pay child support. His father Charles Henry King paid it until shortly before his death in 1930.

Second marriage and family
Three years later, Dorothy met Grand Rapids businessman Gerald Rudolff Ford on February 1, 1917. Then they called her first son Gerald Rudolff Ford Jr., although he was not formally adopted by Ford. Gerald Ford Jr. formally changed his name in 1935, in honor of his stepfather, the only father he really had. At the time, Ford adopted a more conventional spelling of his middle name. Later Ford recounted that his mother insisted he learn to control his temper, one he seemed to have inherited from his biological father.

Dorothy Ford bore three more sons during her second marriage: Thomas Gardner Ford (July 15, 1918 – August 28, 1995), Richard Addison Ford (June 3, 1924 – March 20, 2015), and James Francis Ford (August 11, 1927 - January 23, 2001).

She and Gerald Ford Sr. were buried in Woodlawn Cemetery in Grand Rapids.

References

External links

1892 births
1967 deaths
People from Harvard, Illinois
Gerald Ford family
Burials in Michigan
Mothers of presidents of the United States
Mothers of vice presidents of the United States
20th-century American politicians